Maoricicada otagoensis is a species of cicada that is endemic to New Zealand. This species was first described by John S. Dugdale and Charles Fleming in 1978.

Subspecies
There are two subspecies:
Maoricicada otagoensis maceweni  Dugdale & Fleming, 1978. (Southern speargrass cicada)
Maoricicada otagoensis otagoensis Dugdale & Fleming, 1978. (Otago speargrass cicada)

References

Cicadidae
Cicadas of New Zealand
Insects described in 1978
Endemic fauna of New Zealand
Endemic insects of New Zealand